Allerum is a locality situated in Helsingborg Municipality, Skåne County, Sweden with 716 inhabitants in 2010. Allerum Church contains an altarpiece by artist Johan Christoffer Boklund and fragments of medieval mural paintings.

Notable people
Notable people that were born or lived in Allerum include:
Nils Persson (1836–1916), Swedish consul, businessman, and politician

References 

Populated places in Helsingborg Municipality
Populated places in Skåne County